The Otis Theodore and Effiegene Locke Wingo House is a historic house at 510 West De Queen Avenue in De Queen, Arkansas.  It is a -story wood-frame structure, built in 1904 but altered significantly later.  Originally Queen Anne in style, the house has irregular massing and a complex cross-gabled roof line.  Its original Queen Anne porch was replaced c. 1920 by an American Craftsman style porch with heavy wooden columns set on concrete and brick piers.  A later shed-roof porch wraps around the southern side of the building, and at the rear of the house a 1/2 story was added at a later date.  The house is notable as the home of United States Congressman Otis Theodore Wingo, and his wife Effiegene Locke Wingo, who served out his final term after his death and then was elected to Congress in her own right.

The house was listed on the National Register of Historic Places in 2004.

See also
National Register of Historic Places listings in Sevier County, Arkansas

References

Houses on the National Register of Historic Places in Arkansas
Queen Anne architecture in Arkansas
Houses in Sevier County, Arkansas
National Register of Historic Places in Sevier County, Arkansas